The Romanian Social Democratic Party (PSDR) was a social democratic political party in Romania. Founded in 1990, shortly after the fall of the Communist party rule in Romania in December 1989, it claimed to be the direct successor of the historical Romanian Social Democratic Party (PSD) which existed between 1927 and 1948, until it merged with the Romanian Communist Party (PCR) to create the Romanian Workers' Party (PMR). 

Joining the Socialist International (SI), the party entered alliances with the Democratic Party (PD; forming Uniunea Social-Democrată or the Social Democratic Union during the 1996 legislative election), and took part in the Romanian Democratic Convention (CDR) governments of Victor Ciorbea, Radu Vasile, and Mugur Isărescu (briefly leading the coalition government with Alexandru Athanasiu as acting/ad interim PM in 1999). The PSDR subsequently adhered to the Social Democratic Pole of Romania (PDSR) for the 2000 Romanian general election, and fused into the Social Democratic Party (PSD) on 16 January 2001.

A minority wing opposed to the merger survived as Partidul Social Democrat "Constantin Titel Petrescu", later reforming itself as the Social-Democratic Workers' Party, but was eventually dissolved in 2013.

Notable members 

 Alexandru Athanasiu;
 Sergiu Cunescu;
 Adrian Dimitriu;
 Georgiu Gingăraş.

Electoral history

Legislative elections 

Notes:

1 The CDR members in 1992 were the following ones: the PNȚ-CD (with 21 senators and 41 deputies), the PAC (with 7 senators and 13 deputies), the PNL-AT (with 1 senator and 11 deputies), the PSDR, the PNL-CD (with 4 senators and 3 deputies), and the PER (with no senators and 4 deputies).

2 The members of the USD were the PD (with 22 senators and 43 deputies) and the PSDR.

3 The members of the Social Democratic Pole of Romania (PDSR) were the following ones: the PDSR (with 59 senators and 139 deputies), the PSDR, and the PUR (with 4 senators and 6 deputies).

4 The PSDR merged with the Party of Social Democracy in Romania (PDSR) in 2001.

Presidential elections 

Notes:

1 Emil Constantinescu was the common centre-right presidential candidate who was endorsed by the PSDR in 1992, as part of the CDR.

2 Petre Roman was the presidential candidate of the center-left alliance Social Democratic Union (USD).

3 Ion Iliescu was the presidential candidate of the alliance Social Democratic Pole of Romania (the same acronym as the main party - PDSR).

References

External links 

  Official site of Partidul Social Democrat "Constantin Titel Petrescu"

1990 establishments in Romania
2001 disestablishments in Romania
Defunct socialist parties in Romania
Defunct social democratic parties
Political parties disestablished in 2001
Political parties established in 1990
Social democratic parties in Romania
Social Democratic Party (Romania)